Bill, the Galactic Hero on the Planet of Bottled Brains (BtGH:PoBB) is a novel by Harry Harrison and Robert Sheckley, published in 1990.

Development  
PoBB is one of the novels in the Bill the Galactic Hero series, and the first which was not authored solely by Harrison. After Sheckley's initial collaboration with Harrison in 1990, the following year four additional novels in the series were released, all with Harrison as co-author, most with the same Bill, the Galactic Hero on the Planet of... titles, but involving differing collaborators:  Tasteless Pleasure with David Bischoff, Zombie Vampires with Jack C. Haldeman, Ten Thousand Bars with Bischoff again, and finally Bill the Galactic Hero: The Final Incoherent Adventure with David Harris. As in 1964 when Harrison had originally introduced the character of Bill in the short story The Starsloggers, thirty years later Harrison wrote a post-novelization short story entitled Bill, the Galactic Hero's Happy Holiday which was in Harrison's Galactic Dreams collection of 1994.  

English editions were released in 1990 hardback, 1990 paperback, 1991 Gollancz, 1991 VGSF, 1995/1999, and 2004, as well as an ebook in 2012, and an MP3 audiobook in 2016. The novel was translated into Spanish by Diana Falcon for Grijalbo, German by Hilde Linnert for Heyne, Finnish by Arvi Tamminen for Like Kustannus Oy Ltd, Czech by Jarmila Vergrichtova for Classic And, and Russian by an unspecified translator for the Eksmo imprint.

Plot  
 
PoBB is about the continued adventures of the protagonist Bill, in extraterrestrial universe involving faster-than-light space travel.

Reception  
A review by David Langford was largely negative, noting that many of Sheckley's long-running themes were found in PoBB -- humor, abrupt literary transitions, malfunctioning computers, and philosophical digressions -- but calling the implementation of those recurring thematic elements in PoBB "pale echos of... the remembered sparkle" generated by Scheckley's previous works.  George Mann characterized Sheckley's overall work as "witty satirical fiction... comic and thought-provoking [science fiction]" and had earlier mentioned PoBB as one of Sheckley's late-period works. The book was also reviewed in several zines related to science fiction when it was first published in 1990. 

The book received 3.41 out of five stars at Goodreads.com. Two customer-reviewers gave the book 4 out of 5 stars at Thriftbooks. PoBB received 2.84 out of 5 stars at Library Thing. Customers at amazon.com rated the title 3.0 out of 5 stars, as of 2017.

References

Notes

External links 

American science fiction novels
1990 American novels
Sequel novels